Jerzy Skarżyński (December 16, 1924, Krakow – January 7, 2004, Krakow) was Polish painter, theater and film stage designer, book illustrator and educator.

Awards and decorations
 2000: Commander's Cross of the Order of Polonia Restituta
 During the Polish People's Republic times:
 
 Gold Cross of Merit
 Knight's Cross of the Order of Polonia Restituta

References

1924 births
2004 deaths
Artists from Kraków
Polish illustrators
Recipient of the Meritorious Activist of Culture badge